Seo In-young (born on September 3, 1984), also known as Elly, is a South Korean singer, dancer, model, television host, and actress.  She was a member of girl group Jewelry and featured on the reality show We Got Married with Crown J.  In May 2012, Seo established her own private entertainment company, IY Company. Seo also hosted the beauty program Star Beauty Show (2012).

Career

2007: Elly Is So Hot

On February 26, 2007, Seo In-young released her first solo album, Elly Is So Hot.  Despite being known as the 'sexy dancer' of Jewelry, she stated she wanted to move away from her strong dance image and become a softer, elegant and more sensual entertainer.  The first single from the album was "I Want You" ("너를 원해"), which was written, composed, and produced by Jung Yeon-joon of Uptown.

The song, which has a mix of Latin and R&B styles, was promoted as a dance remix near the end of her promotional activities.

2008: Elly Is Cinderella

In February 2008, it was announced that the singer would be participating in the popular MBC variety show We Got Married.  She was paired with Korean urban artist Crown J.  The couple was later coined as the 'Ant Couple'.  The couple later released a digital single titled Too Much, which was eventually used as the theme song for the show.  A club remix version was released on her second solo album.

On July 23, 2008, Seo In-young released her second solo album, Elly Is Cinderella.  The music video of the lead single, Cinderella, was composed by PSY. The song continued her success as solo artist.

2009: Departure from Jewelry

On December 11, 2009, it was announced that Seo In-young, as well as fellow Jewelry member Park Jung-ah, would be leaving the group to fully commit to their solo careers. Both members left the group after finishing promotional activities for the song Sophisticated.

2010: Lov-Elly and Ellythm
On May 12, 2010, Seo In-young pre-released, "Goodbye Romance", the lead single from her upcoming album. On June 6, 2010, her third album, Lov-Elly, was released.  (This was her first release since leaving Jewelry.) The album, which consists of all ballads, showed a soft, but powerful side to the singer.

"Goodbye Romance" experienced enormous chart success and eventually peaked at No. 1 on the music program M! Countdown, earning the singer her first solo award.

In July 2010, the singer joined the SBS reality show Heroes.  She received a lot of negative press for her feisty and headstrong persona.

On December 12, 2010, Seo In-young released her first single album, Ellythm.  It includes the lead single Into The Rhythm.

2011: Wash and Brand New Elly
In early 2011, the Jongno branch of Cheil Industries named Seo In-young as the creative director of their imports division.  She worked with French luxury brand 'Nina Ricci' to design a limited edition handbag line named 'Nine Ricci x Seo In-young'.

On May 6, 2011, Seo In-young released her second single album Wash.  The emotional song showcased her exceptionally powerful vocals.  The music video was said to be filmed in Thailand, with a concept of multiple emotions, such as an elegant woman underwater and a sad woman in front of a mirror.  Star Empire Entertainment released a music video teaser and a behind the scenes video, however, no official music video was released.

On August 20, 2011, the singer participated in the popular television show Immortal Songs 2.  The episode, dubbed 'female vocalist special', showcased seven of South Korea's top female vocalists.  Seo In-Young's rendition of Just Like The First Time won the hearts of viewers and was declared as the best performance of the episode.

On October 4, 2011, two comeback photos of the singer were released ahead of her official comeback.  In early November, she pre-released the song Loser.  On November 13, 2011, the singer officially released her third album, Brand New Elly, with the lead single Oh My Gosh.

2012: IY Company, ANYMORE and Let's Dance
On May 18, 2012, it was announced that Seo In-young would be establishing her own private entertainment company, IY Company.  She is no longer associated or under contract with Star Empire Entertainment.

On August 13, 2012, Seo In-young became the main MC of 'SBS E! – Star Beauty Show'.  The show focuses on beauty and fashion tips.

On August 13, 2012, a music video teaser for Seo In-young's digital single, ANYMORE, was released.  It was later revealed the song was produced by popular producer Kush.  The single was officially released on August 19, 2012. The full-length music video was released two days later.  The single quickly experienced enormous success, securing the No. 1 spot on every single Korean music chart, achieving the coveted 'all-kill'.

On October 15, 2012, Seo In-young revealed a music video teaser for Let's Dance.  The song, which was digitally released on October 17, 2012, is a dance track combining elements of electronic disco as well as post disco, further showing the musical style changes Seo In-young has been going through. On October 18, 2012, Seo In-young took to the stage and began promotions on M! Countdown, where she performed ANYMORE and Let's Dance.

2013: Forever Young and Love Me

In early 2013, Seo In-young became a main voice coach for Voice Korea Kids, a spin-off of The Voice of Korea.  The show aired from January 4, 2013, to February 1, 2013.

On May 2, 2013, Seo In-young announced that she would be making her first comeback of the year with the release of concept photos and a music video teaser.  Her company, IY Company, stated, "With her talents, this will be an album that showcases her new potential." On May 14, 2013, Seo In-young released her first mini-album in two years, titled Forever Young.  The album is considered Seo In-young's return to ballads and contains the promotional single "Let's Break Up."

On September 23, 2013, it was announced that Seo In-young would be returning to the music scene with a digital single titled "Love Me".  According to Seo In-young, the song is "an upbeat dance track through which she puts aside her previous ballad concept". On October 3, 2013, Seo In-young debuted her new song, "Love Me", through a pre-release performance on Mnet's M! Countdown. The single and music video were officially released the following day.  "Love Me" was instantly met with positive reviews and quickly climbed digital charts.

2016: Back to Star Empire Entertainment, Comeback
Seo in Young returned to Star Empire after 4 years, stating it was a "move of loyalty".

Personal life 
On December 26, 2022, Seo announced that she will hold a wedding ceremony with her boyfriend on February 26, 2023.

Discography

Studio albums

Extended plays

Singles

Promotional singles

Collaborations

Soundtracks

Filmography

Drama
2009: Style (Cameo)
2011: Bravo, My Love! (Cameo)
2016: One More Happy Ending (Leading role)

Variety
2008: Music Bank (Main MC; August 29, 2008 – January 9, 2009)
2009: We Got Married (S1; EP 1–41)
2009: Seo In-young's Kaist
2009: Seo In-young's Best Friend
2010: Heroes (EP 1–40)
2012: Star Beauty Show (Main MC)
2013: The Voice Kids Korea (Coach)
2013: Immortal Songs 2
2015: King of Mask Singer (Daebak Change 1+1 ; EP 9)
2016: Real Men (cast member, Navy NCO special)
2016: With You (S2; 78-present with Crown J)
2022: We Are Family (MBC, Cast Member)

Awards

Mnet Asian Music Awards

References

External links 

 Discography on Naver Music 
 Profile on Nate 
 

1984 births
Living people
Jewelry (group) members
South Korean female dancers
South Korean female idols
South Korean women pop singers
South Korean television actresses